Hein Zar Aung ( born 28 June 1990) is a footballer from Myanmar. He made his first appearance for the Myanmar national football team in 2015.

References 

1990 births
Living people
Burmese footballers
Myanmar international footballers
Magway FC players
Association football midfielders